Alexandra Louise Mayer (born 2 June 1981) is a former British Member of the European Parliament (MEP) for the East of England region for the Labour Party. She took up the post in November 2016 following the resignation of Richard Howitt, and lost her seat in the 2019 European Elections.

Early life
Mayer was born in High Wycombe, Buckinghamshire and brought up in Crawley, West Sussex.

Mayer graduated with a bachelor's degree in history from Exeter University in 2001 and has a master's degree in Politics and Parliamentary Studies from the University of Leeds.

Politics
In the 2014 European Parliament election she stood in for the East of England region in second position on the Labour list, which did not yield a seat, but took over from Richard Howitt following his resignation.

Mayer is a member of the Labour Party's National Policy Forum, a member of the GMB, UNISON and the Co-operative Party.

In the European Parliament she was Labour's spokesperson for the foreign affairs (16-18) and the economy (18-19) and a member of the US-EU Relations Delegation. She is the international co-ordinator for the Washington DC Statehood campaign.

A member of the Labour Animal Welfare Society, Alex is a long-standing animal welfare campaigner, she was awarded the Cruelty Free International Parliamentarian Award and took an 8 million signature petition to the United Nations in New York on the topic of animal free cosmetic testing.

Mayer has been a member of Amnesty International for over twenty years and worked on issues relating to the ongoing human rights abuses in Kashmir, as a member of the European Parliament Friends of Kashmir group.

References

1981 births
21st-century women MEPs for England
People educated at Hazelwick School
Living people
Labour Party (UK) MEPs
MEPs for England 2014–2019
People from Crawley
People from High Wycombe